Chapel Hill is a historic plantation house located near Berryville, Clarke County, Virginia. The oldest sections of the main house dates to the mid-1820s and is in the Federal style. They are the central two-story, six-bay section, which consists of two distinct gable-roofed blocks; and the two-story, three-bay section now at the southernmost end of the house. The house was remodeled and enlarged in 1941 in the Colonial Revival style, after plans drawn up by George L. Howe, a Washington, DC architect.  Also on the property are the contributing stable, groom's house, frame bank barn, machine shed, corncrib, barn, chicken coop, and three small sheds.  The property was purchased by William J. Donovan (1883-1959) in 1938, who subsequently undertook the renovation and expansion of the main house.  Architect George L. Howe designed alterations and additions during 1938–1941.

It was listed on the National Register of Historic Places in 2004.

References

Plantation houses in Virginia
Houses on the National Register of Historic Places in Virginia
National Register of Historic Places in Clarke County, Virginia
Federal architecture in Virginia
Colonial Revival architecture in Virginia
Houses completed in 1825
Houses in Clarke County, Virginia